Renzo Rossellini may refer to:

 Renzo Rossellini (composer) (1908–1982), Italian composer
 Renzo Rossellini (producer) (born 1941), Italian film producer